Laligurans is a municipality located in Terhathum District in the Province No. 1 of eastern Nepal. After the government announcement, the municipality was established on 19 September 2015 by merging the existing Basantapur, Phulek, Dangpa, Sungnam and Solma village development committees (VDCs). The center of the municipality is established in Basantpur. At the time of the 2011 Nepal census after merging the five VDCs population it had a total population of 16,934 persons. After the government decision the number of municipalities has reached 217 in Nepal.

Tourism
Basantpur is a major tourist place to watch mountains and interesting place surrounding it. Rich Limbu culture attract tourist to reside there. Lasune is one of the most important attractive place for internal and external tourism. Lasune Bazar, Lasun Stamba, Tea Garden, Patle Pokhari, Kala Pani, Tinjure Hill, Rat Pokhari, Kesari Taar, Dhap Taar etc. are naturally  beautiful places .

References

External links
UN map of the municipalities of Terhathum District

Populated places in Tehrathum District
Municipalities in Koshi Province
Nepal municipalities established in 2015
Municipalities in Tehrathum District